Maurice Bénichou (23 January 1943 in Tlemcen, French Algeria – 14 June 2019) was a French actor. His best known roles include three collaborations with director Michael Haneke (Code inconnu, Le Temps du Loup, and Caché), and a part in Jean-Pierre Jeunet's Amélie. He has also played in Peter Brook's 1989 film version of The Mahabharata.

Filmography

1969: Paris n'existe pas (directed by Robert Benayoun)
1972: Les Camisards (directed by  René Allio) - Moïse Plantat
1973: Le Mariage à la mode (directed by  Michel Mardore)
1976: Le Petit Marcel (directed by Jacques Fansten) - Garcia
1976: Un éléphant ça trompe énormément (directed by Yves Robert) - Gonthier
1977: La Question (directed by Laurent Heynemann) - Vincent
1977: L'Animal (directed by Claude Zidi) - Le valet
1978: Dirty Dreamer (directed by Jean-Marie Périer) - Taupin
1978: Les Routes du sud (directed by Joseph Losey) - Garcia
1978: La Vocation suspendue (directed by Raoul Ruiz) - Le membre de la Dévotion #1
1979: I... comme Icare (I as in Icarus) (directed by Henri Verneuil) - Robert Sanio, l'homme à la caméra
1981: Le Jardinier (directed by Jean-Pierre Sentier) - The overseer
1981: Instinct de femme (directed by Claude Othnin-Girard) - Le conférencier des rats
1982: Qu'est-ce qui fait courir David ? (directed by Elie Chouraqui) - Albert
1990: The Mahabharata (TV Mini-Series) (directed by Peter Brook) - Kitchaka
1990: La Fracture du myocarde (directed by Jacques Fansten) - Le voisin
1993: La Petite apocalypse (directed by Costa-Gavras) - Arnold
1993: Fausto (directed by Rémy Duchemin) - Lucien
1993: Tout le monde n'a pas eu la chance d'avoir des parents communistes (directed by Jean-Jacques Zilbermann) - Bernard
1994: Les Patriotes (directed by Éric Rochant) - Yuri
1997: Mordbüro (directed by Lionel Kopp) - Léo Stoychev
1998: L'homme est une femme comme les autres (Man Is a Woman) (directed by Jean-Jacques Zilbermann) - Père de Rosalie / Rosalie's father
2000: Drôle de Félix (directed by Olivier Ducastel and Jacques Martineau) - Fisherman
2000: Code inconnu (directed by Michael Haneke) - The Old Arab
2000: Quand on sera grand (directed by Renaud Cohen) - Isaac
2000: Amélie (directed by Jean-Pierre Jeunet) - Dominique Bretodeau
2001: Candidature (directed by Emmanuel Bourdieu) - Le président du jury
2002: C'est le bouquet ! (directed by Jeanne Labrune) - Antoine
2003: Le Temps du Loup (directed by Michael Haneke) - M. Azoulay
2003: Qui perd gagne ! (directed by Laurent Bénégui) - Serge Vaudier
2005: Caché (directed by Michael Haneke) - Majid
2005: Le Passager (directed by Éric Caravaca) - Joseph
2007: Boxes (directed by Jane Birkin) - Max
2007: Le Candidat (directed by Niels Arestrup) - Maxime - écrivain
2007: Les Toits de Paris (directed by Hiner Saleem) - Amar
2008: Paris (directed by Cédric Klapisch) - Le psy
2008: Passe-passe (directed by Tonie Marshall) - Serge
2008: Le Grand Alibi (directed by Pascal Bonitzer) - Lieutenant Grange
2008: Inju: The Beast in the Shadow (directed by Barbet Schroeder)- L'agent d'Alex Fayard
2009: La Grande Vie (directed by Emmanuel Salinger) - Kowalski
2009: Jusqu'à toi (directed by Jennifer Devoldère) - Le réceptionniste / Receptionist
2009: Mensch (directed by Steve Suissa) - Simon Safran
2011: Si tu meurs, je te tue (directed by Hiner Saleem) - L'employé de la morgue
2011: The Rabbi's Cat (directed by Antoine Delesvaux and Joann Sfar)- Le rabbin (voice)
2011: Omar Killed Me (directed by Roschdy Zem) - Jacques Vergès
2011: L'amour fraternel (TV Movie) (directed by Gérard Vergez) - Père Chanu
2011: Au cas où je n'aurais pas la palme d'or (directed by Renaud Cohen) - Le rabbin / Maurice Bénichou
2015: The Kind Words (directed by Shemi Zarhin)  - Maurice Lyon (final film role)

References

External links

1943 births
2019 deaths
Pieds-Noirs
French male film actors
French male stage actors
French male television actors